Burley, or Burley-on-the-Hill, is a village and civil parish in the county of Rutland in the East Midlands of England.  It is located two miles (3 km) north-east of Oakham. The population of the civil parish was 577 at the 2001 census, including Egleton, but reducing to 325 at the 2011 census.

The village's name means 'wood/clearing with a fortification'.

In the parish, north of the village, is Alstoe, the site of a possible small motte-and-bailey castle, and part of the deserted medieval village of Alsthorpe. Alstoe was the name of a hundred.

In 1379 Sir Thomas le Despenser granted the Burley manor to trustees, two of whom were his brother Henry, Bishop of Norwich and his nephew Hugh le Despenser. Thomas died without issue in 1381, when at the outbreak of the Peasants' Revolt, Henry was at Burley and travelled to Norwich to confront the rebels.

The Old Smithy on the village green was used in advertisements for Cherry Blossom shoe polish in the 1920s.

HM Prison Ashwell was located about one mile (2 km) west of the centre of the village on what was previously the site of a World War II US Army base, home to part of the 82nd Airborne Division. Ashwell Prison closed in March 2011 and has been redeveloped as Oakham Enterprise Park, a business park for office and light industrial use.

Burley-on-the-Hill House
The mansion in the village overlooks Rutland Water. The first house was owned by Sir John Harington of Exton. On New Year's day 1596 he produced a performance of Titus Andronicus and a masque written by his brother-in-law Sir Edward Wingfield at Burley. Harington's daughter Lucy Russell, Countess of Bedford sold Burley to George Villiers, 1st Duke of Buckingham in 1620 for £28,000. Buckingham produced Ben Jonson's masque The Gypsies Metamorphosed at Burley in 1621 to celebrate his marriage to Katherine Manners. Later in 1621 Buckingham requested Scottish fir tree seeds and saplings for the park from the Earl of Mar, and 1624 the Earl of Northumberland sent 1,000 walnut trees.

The house in the manner associated with Sir Christopher Wren, was built in the 1690s<ref>Foundations were laid in 1694 (H. J. Habakkuk, "Daniel Finch, 2nd Earl of Nottingham: His House and Estate", J. H. Plumb, ed. Studies in Social History  1955).</ref> by Daniel Finch, 2nd Earl of Nottingham, who was to a large extent his own architect and involved himself in the minutiae of construction, but employed Henry Dormer (died 1727) to supervise its building. Nottingham replaced Dormer with John Lumley in 1697. Before embarking on the project, Lord Nottingham consulted Sir Christopher Wren and had measurements taken at Berkeley House and Montagu House in London. The house, in an H-plan, has a pedimented central block and lightly projecting end pavilions. With its symmetrical wings and outbuildings forming a cour d'honneur, and segmental walling linking matching blocks in a larger outer grassed court, it forms one of the most ambitious aristocratic ensembles of the late seventeenth century.

A dining room was designed for Daniel Finch, 8th Earl of Winchilsea, and installed in 1778.

In 1908 a fire broke out during a party attended by Winston Churchill, destroying the west part of the house.

The mansion was converted into six dwellings by Kit Martin in 1993–98, with a further 22 dwellings on the estate. Previously the estate had been purchased by Asil Nadir in 1991.

Church

The church of the Holy Cross, adjacent to the mansion, is in the care of the Churches Conservation Trust. It contains a moving memorial by Sir Francis Chantrey to Lady Charlotte Finch (1820).

Cricket venue

George Finch, 9th Earl of Winchilsea, lived at the mansion in the late 18th century and used its grounds to stage a number of cricket matches, six of them first-class, between 1790 and 1793. As late as 1814, the venue was used for a Rutland v Nottingham game.

References

Bibliography
 Howard Colvin, A Biographical Dictionary of British Architects, 1600–1840'', 3rd ed. (Yale University Press) 1995

External links 

 Burley on the Hill mansion photo

Villages in Rutland
History of Rutland
Civil parishes in Rutland